Jane Marie (February 12, 1978) is a Peabody and Emmy Award-winning journalist well known for producing This American Life for nearly a decade. She now co-owns Little Everywhere, a podcast production house and recording studio in Los Angeles.

Career 
Marie started her career in 2002 as an intern at This American Life before being promoted to producer and music supervisor of TAL and television series of the same name. She still consults as music supervisor on the popular radio show.

Also a writer, Marie served as an editor for Jezebel and The Hairpin and has penned regular columns for sites including The Toast and Cosmopolitan. Known for straight talking and occasionally controversial opinions, Marie launched a Jezebel advice column titled "Dear Jane" in 2017, answering questions on everything from sex to racism.

In 2016, she partnered with musician, producer and audio engineer Dann Gallucci to open a podcast production house and recording studio called Little Everywhere. In addition to working with clients like Midroll, Earwolf, Stitcher and Audible, she is the host of Tinder's official podcast, DTR.

Personal life 
Marie was born Jane Marie Golombisky in Ann Arbor, Michigan on February 12, 1978. After dropping out of high-school and earning a diploma through the mail, she graduated with honors from the University of Illinois.

Her decision to go solely by her first and middle names came after marrying and subsequently divorcing Rick Feltes and comedian Julian McCullough, with whom she has a daughter, Goldie. Marie and Goldie live in Los Angeles, California.

Awards 
 2020: The Webbys Award: Best Podcast Writing
 2019: iHeart Radio Award, Best Branded Podcast "DTR"
 2009: Emmy Award nomination, Outstanding Nonfiction Series, This American Life
 2008: Emmy Award, Outstanding Nonfiction Series, This American Life
 2007: IDA Continuing Series Award, This American Life
 2006: Peabody Award, This American Life

References

External links 

  of Little Everywhere
  of DTR
  of Jezebel
  of Midroll

1978 births
Living people
University of Illinois Urbana-Champaign alumni
This American Life people
American women journalists
People from Ann Arbor, Michigan
American women podcasters
American podcasters
21st-century American women